TMetric is time tracking software operated by TMetric team, headquartered in Prague, Czech Republic, that offers time tracking service for freelancers and small business owners who want to optimize their business processes and increase personal productivity.

Details
The service was created for personal use to track time spent on tasks from RedMine and Jira. Now it supports much more integrations and released for a public use as simple task and time management application. TMetric now used by project managers  and SMBs who measure budgets for their projects and get detailed time and money reports. Time entries is gathered via cloud service and displayed in a real-time.

See also
Comparison of time tracking software

References

External links
Official site

Time-tracking software
Software companies of the Czech Republic